The community of Indians in Qatar includes Indian expatriates in Qatar, as well as people born in Qatar of Indian origin. Qatar has a total population of 2,740,479 . The Indian population in the country currently stands at around 691,000.

Overview

More and more Indian students in Qatar, especially Doha, are opting for distance education programmes after passing their higher secondary examinations. After clearing their Central Board of Secondary Education (CBSE) Class 12 exams, the students are making a beeline for the various distance education programmes offered by a number of Indian universities in Qatar.

There is also a sizable population of second or third generation Qatari-born Indians. They share characteristics with other third culture kids, forming a cultural identity that blends their heritage culture and the myriad of foreign cultures they encounter growing up in the Qatar, and a more fluid sense of home. Those who grow up in western compounds tend to be well-assimilated into western culture, whereas those who stay in Indian neighborhoods such as Najma or Mughlina tend to be more in touch with India. Many Qatari-born Indians further migrate to countries such as the United States, Canada, Australia and New Zealand both for greater economic and lifestyle opportunities, and due to the Qatar's restrictive citizenship practices; many are forced to leave when no longer deemed valuable by the government. There is also a large area known as Asian Town specifically targeted at Working Class Indian Immigrants

Controversy

According to media reports and Indian government figures published on February 17, 2014 more than 1000 Indians working in Qatar have died in the past two years, obtained by news wire AFP under right of information laws.
According to the Indian embassy in Qatar, 237 workers died in 2012 and 218 in 2013. The figures follow similar data revealed to AFP by the Nepalese embassy in Doha last month, showing 191 deaths recorded in 2013, with many of them from "unnatural" heart failure, compared with 169 the year before.  The Indian embassy did not give details about the circumstances of the deaths.

Education
Indian schools in Qatar include:
 Birla Public School
 Doha Modern Indian School
DPS Modern Indian School
 Ideal Indian School
 M.E.S Indian school
 Shantiniketan Indian School
 Bhavans Public School
Delhi Public School
Al Khor International School
Loyola International School (LIS, Doha)
Noble International School (NIS)
Pearl School (Pearl)

See also
 Embassy of India, Doha
Indian Cultural Centre (ICC Qatar)
Indian Community Facebook Page

References

External links

Qatar
Ethnic groups in Qatar
 
India–Qatar relations